Lee Road–Shaker Heights was a former park and ride railroad station along Lee Road (just south of Miles Avenue (Route 43)) in the Lee-Miles neighborhood of Cleveland, Ohio.  The station was located on the Erie Railroad's Mahoning Division, which ran from Pymatuning, Pennsylvania to Cleveland.

The station was first opened on November 22, 1948, by the Erie Railroad as a park and ride for commuters, with a parking lot and connections to bus and taxi. The station remained in service along the commuter line to Cleveland, which persisted after all passenger service was cut in the state of Ohio after January 5–6, 1970, when The Lake Cities last ran from Hoboken Terminal in Hoboken, New Jersey to Dearborn Station in Chicago, Illinois. The commuter train between Cleveland and Youngstown, Ohio was ended with the run of Train 28 by the Consolidated Rail Corporation (Conrail) on January 14, 1977. The station depot and canopy remain at the station site, but the roof has since caved in on the depot.

History

Last train: January 14, 1977 

After six month test run by Conrail, the agency officially ended service from Cleveland Union Terminal to Youngstown, due to loss of money. On a snow-covered January 14, 1977, numerous passengers, including railfans, historians and people interested in seeing or riding the train. People crammed themselves into the three cars attached with Engine 4014, playing games, talking and having refreshments as Train 28 left the Union Terminal at 5:24. The train made stops along the line to Youngstown including East 55th Street, Lee Road, North Randall, Solon, Geauga Lake, Aurora, Mantua, Jeddoe, Garrettsville–Hiram, Warren, Niles and into Youngstown. At the end of the ride in Youngstown, the train stayed for twenty minutes while the train got photographed by the railfans of the Railroad Enthusiasts. After that, the train deadheaded into Brier Hill Yard for the passenger cars to be detached, while  the locomotive, 4014, was converted for use to freight service.

See also 
Cleveland commuter rail

References

Bibliography 

Former Erie Railroad stations
Railway stations in the United States opened in 1948
Railway stations closed in 1977
Rail transportation in Cleveland
Transportation buildings and structures in Cleveland
1948 establishments in Ohio
Former railway stations in Ohio